Caps are flat headgear.

Caps or CAPS may also refer to:

Science and technology

Computing
 CESG Assisted Products Service, provided by the U.K. Government Communications Headquarters
 Composite Application Platform Suite, by Java Caps, a Java framework
 Computer Animation Production System, a film animation post-production system developed by Walt Disney Feature Animation and Pixar

Biology, medicine and psychology

Genetics
 Calcyphosin, the CAPS gene and its protein
 Cleaved amplified polymorphic sequence, markers used to detect a polymorphic sequence

Medical conditions
 Auditory processing disorder (APD), formerly Central Auditory Processing Syndrome
 Catastrophic antiphospholipid syndrome
 Cryopyrin-associated periodic syndrome, a spectrum of autoinflammatory syndrome

Other uses in biology, medicine and psychology
 CAPS (buffer), N-cyclohexyl-3-aminopropanesulfonic acid, in biochemistry, a buffering agent
 Cognitive-affective personality system, a model within psychology of personality

Other uses in science and technology
 Cassini Plasma Spectrometer, a direct sensing instrument that measures the energy and electrical charge of particles
 Cirrus Airframe Parachute System, a whole-aircraft emergency parachute system developed by Ballistic Recovery Systems and Cirrus 
 Collective Awareness Platforms for Sustainability and Social Innovation, a program of the European Commission

Companies and organizations
 Californians for Population Stabilization
 Captive Animals Protection Society
 Center for Advanced Public Safety at the University of Alabama
 Center for Analysis and Prediction of Storms
 Comic Art Professional Society
 Policy Planning Staff (France), Centre d'Analyse, de Prévision et de Stratégie

Sport
 Caps (gamer), Danish esports player
 Cap (sport), a measure of a player's international appearances, especially in football
 Washington Capitals, an American ice hockey team

Other uses
 Caps (party), an 18th-century Swedish political faction
 All caps, formatting text to only use capital/uppercase letters
 Caps, Texas, Taylor County, Texas, U.S.
 Chicago Alternative Policing Strategy, a government program in Illinois, U.S.

See also

 
 
 Cap (disambiguation)
 Capps (disambiguation)
 St. John's IceCaps, an AHL team
 Raleigh IceCaps, an ECHL team